Chapels may refer to:
the plural of Chapel
Places
Chapels, Cumbria, England